The 2015 season for the  cycling team began in February at the Tour of Qatar. The team participated in UCI Continental Circuits and UCI World Tour events when given a wildcard invitation.

2015 roster

Riders who joined the team for the 2015 season

Riders who left the team during or after the 2014 season

Season victories

National, Continental and World champions 2015

Footnotes

References

External links
 

2015 road cycling season by team